Lothar Heinrich (born 30 April 1941) is an Austrian sports shooter. He competed at the 1984 Summer Olympics and the 1988 Summer Olympics.

References

1941 births
Living people
Austrian male sport shooters
Olympic shooters of Austria
Shooters at the 1984 Summer Olympics
Shooters at the 1988 Summer Olympics
People from Varnsdorf
20th-century Austrian people